William Westgarth (15 June 1815 – 28 October 1889) was a Scottish-born merchant, historian, statistician and politician in Australia. Westgarth was a member of the New South Wales Legislative Council, and, later, the Victorian Legislative Council.

Early life
William Westgarth was the son of another Westgarth, surveyor-general of customs for Scotland, and his wife Christian, née Thomson He was born at Edinburgh. He was educated at the high schools at Leith and Edinburgh, and at Dr Bruce's school at Newcastle-on-Tyne. He then entered the office of G. Young and Company of Leith, who were engaged in the Australian trade, and realising the possibilities of the new land, decided to emigrate to Australia.

Career in Australia
Westgarth arrived in Melbourne on 13 December 1840, then a town of three or four thousand people. Its size, and the limits of colonisation, in the 1840s may be gleaned from the fact, that Westgarth witnessed a corroboree involving 700 Aboriginal Australians, in a place a little more than a mile to the north of the present general post office. He went into business as a merchant and general importer, and the firm was later in Market Street under the name of Westgarth, Ross and Spowers. Westgarth was involved in every movement for the advancement of Melbourne and the Port Phillip district. He became a member of the national board of education, in 1850 was elected unopposed to represent Melbourne in the Legislative Council of New South Wales, succeeding Henry Grey, 3rd Earl Grey, and he took an important part in the separation movement. It was he who originated the idea that the hoofs of the bullocks should settle the boundary question. If they showed that the droves were heading north, that country should remain in New South Wales, if south it should become part of the new colony.

When the new colony of Victoria was constituted in 1851, Westgarth headed the poll for City of Melbourne at the election for the Victorian Legislative Council on 13 September 1851. Westgarth held that seat until resigning in April 1853. He had had many activities during the previous 10 years. In 1842 he was one of the founders of the Melbourne Mechanics' Institute, afterwards the Athenaeum; he had done much writing, beginning in 1845 with a half-yearly Report Commercial Statistical and General on the District of Port Phillip. This was followed in 1846 by a pamphlet, A Report on the Condition, Capabilities and Prospects of the Australian Aborigines, and in 1848 by Australia Felix, A Historical and Descriptive Account of the Settlement of Port Phillip. In 1851 he founded the Melbourne Chamber of Commerce and was elected its first president. He visited England in 1853 and brought out another version of his last book under the title Victoria; late Australia Felix. Soon after his return to Australia in 1854 he was appointed a member of the commission of inquiry to go into the circumstances of the Eureka rebellion. Westgarth was elected chairman and showed much tact in his conduct of the inquiry. The commission recommended a general amnesty to the prisoners, who, however, were tried and acquitted.

England
In 1857 Westgarth went to England, settled in London, and as William Westgarth and Company began business as colonial agents and brokers. He established a great reputation as the adviser of various colonial governments floating loans in London, and was continually consulted during the next 30 years. The finding of gold in Victoria having entirely altered the conditions, Westgarth published a fresh book on the colony, Victoria and the Australian gold mines in 1857 : with notes on the overland route from Australia, via Suez. In 1861 he published Australia its Rise, Progress and Present Conditions, largely based on articles written by him for the Encyclopædia Britannica, and in 1864 he brought out his fourth book on Victoria, The Colony of Victoria; its Social and Political Institutions. In the preface to this he stated that though he had written four times on this subject, each volume had been a fresh work, written without even opening the pages of the previous volumes. He also wrote some pamphlets on economic and social subjects, and edited in 1863, Tracks of McKinlay and Party across Australia. Another piece of editing was a volume of Essays, dealing with the reconstruction of London and the housing of the poor which appeared in 1886. For many years he endeavoured to form a chamber of commerce in London, and at last succeeded in getting sufficient support in 1881. He revisited Australia in 1888 and was everywhere welcomed. When the Melbourne international exhibition was opened he walked in the procession through the avenue of nations alongside Francis Henty, then the sole survivor of the brotherhood who founded Victoria. As a result of his visit two volumes appeared: Personal Recollections of Early Melbourne and Victoria, in 1888, and Half a Century of Australasian Progress, in 1889. Returning to Great Britain Westgarth died suddenly at London on 28 October 1889. He married in 1853 and was survived by a widow and two daughters.

Works

See also
Westgarth, Victoria, a locality in Melbourne
Westgarthtown, Victoria, a historic village in Melbourne

References

Additional resources listed by the Australian Dictionary of Biography

G. H. Nadel, Mid-Nineteenth Century Political Thought in Australia (M.A. thesis, University of Melbourne, 1950)

External links 
 
 
 
 

1815 births
1889 deaths
Members of the New South Wales Legislative Council
Members of the Victorian Legislative Council
19th-century Australian politicians
19th-century Australian historians